"We're Back!" is a song by The Lonely Island.

We're Back! or We're Back may also refer to:

 We're Back! (album), by the Cal. State L.A. Jazz Ensemble
 We're Back! A Dinosaur's Story (book)
 We're Back! A Dinosaur's Story (film)
 "We're Back", a song by Eminem on the album Eminem Presents: The Re-Up